Monarch is an American musical drama television series about a country music family. Created by Melissa London Hilfers, the series is the first production of Fox Entertainment Studios.

Susan Sarandon stars as Dottie Cantrell, with Trace Adkins, Anna Friel, Beth Ditto, Martha Higareda, Iñigo Pascual, and Joshua Sasse forming the main cast. The series premiered September 11, 2022, on Fox and Hulu. In December 2022, Fox canceled the series after one season.

Premise
Dottie and Albie Roman lead a country music dynasty at the center of a multigenerational family drama. Daughter Nicky Roman does all she can to protect the dynasty's reign in country music while ensuring her own stardom.

Cast and characters

Main
 Anna Friel as Nicolette "Nicky" Roman, Dottie and Albie's daughter who struggles to live up to her family's legacy.
 Taegan Burns as Young Nicky
 Trace Adkins as Albie Roman, Dottie's husband and a legendary singer-songwriter known as the "Texas Truthteller".
 Joshua Sasse as Luke Roman, Dottie and Albie's son and the CEO of Monarch Records.
 Gavin Bedell as Young Luke
 Beth Ditto as Georgina "Gigi" Taylor-Roman, Dottie and Albie's younger daughter who shunned the spotlight.
 Elena Murray as Young Gigi
 Iñigo Pascual as Ace Grayson, Nicky's and Clive's adopted son.
 Meagan Holder as Kayla Taylor-Roman, Gigi's wife.
 Susan Sarandon as Dottie Cantrell Roman, the "Queen of Country Music".
 Mandy Barnett as the singing voice of Dottie
Eva Amurri as Young Dottie, as seen in flashbacks. Amurri is the real-life daughter of Sarandon.
 Emma Milani as Ana Phoenix, an up-and-coming artist hoping to sign with Monarch
 Martha Higareda as Catt Phoenix, Ana's mother, who has a link to the Roman's past.

Recurring
 Adam Croasdell as Clive Grayson, Nicky's adulterous husband who works in the film industry
 Ava Grace as Tatum Grayson, Nicky and Clive's adopted daughter
 Faith Prince as Nellie Cantrell, Dottie's sister
 Callum Kerr as Wade Stellings, a hot new artist signed to Monarch Records.
 Libby Blake as Marybeth Oldenburg, the medical examiner  
 Kevin Cahoon as Earl Clark, Dottie's faithful personal assistant, who later becomes Nicky's
 D. W. Moffett as Tripp DeWitt, the district attorney “Uncle” of the Roman family
 Damon Dayoub as Jamie Burke, a music producer who begins working with Albie and later becomes Nicky's love interest

Guest
Martina McBride as herself
Shania Twain as herself
Little Big Town as themselves 
Caitlyn Smith as herself
Tanya Tucker as herself 
Devan Katherine as Imogen Lowe
Gabriela Hernandez as Rosa Flores

Episodes

Truthteller 1839 
Tying into the first season’s 7th episode (“About Last Night”), Fox Entertainment partnered with ReserveBar and Next Century Spirits to create a “new double-barreled straight bourbon whiskey” named Truthteller 1839. The whiskey took its name from Albie Roman’s legendary moniker – The Texas Truthteller – and the product was featured in show as part of the Monarch empire’s latest business venture.

Production

Development
The series was announced in May 2021. It is created and executive produced by Melissa London Hilfers. Michael Rauch was the original showrunner and one of the executive producers but he was replaced by Jon Feldman in November 2021. Other executive producers are Hend Baghdady, Gail Berman and Jason Owen. The episodes will be hour-long. Jason Ensler has been tapped to direct and executive produce the two-part pilot. Principal photography for the series began on September 13, 2021, and concluded on March 31, 2022, in Atlanta, Georgia. On December 7, 2022, it was announced that the series was cancelled after one season by Fox.

Casting
In September 2021 Susan Sarandon, Trace Adkins, Beth Ditto, Josh Sasse, Megan Holder, Inigo Dominic Pascual, Martha Higareda and Emma Milani were announced to join the series in leading roles along with the recurring cast: Eva Amurri, Adam Croasdell and Faith Prince. In November 2021, Callum Kerr, Kevin Cahoon, Reshma Shetty, Damon Dayoub and D.W. Moffett were announced to join the series' recurring cast. On August 17, 2022, a trailer for the series revealed that several country stars would appear in the show as themselves, including Shania Twain, Martina McBride, Tanya Tucker and Little Big Town.

Release
The series was originally scheduled to premiere on January 30, 2022. On January 12, 2022, Fox announced that due to COVID-19-related issues and the change in showrunner impacting production, and to allow for reshoots and a more thorough promotional campaign, the premiere of Monarch had been delayed to fall 2022. The series premiered on September 11, 2022, as a lead out of Fox's NFL coverage, with the pilot airing four times in a timespan of four days.

Music
The title track of the series "The Card You Gamble", which was written by Nashville songwriters Liz Rose, Lori McKenna and Hillary Lindsey and performed by singer-songwriter Caitlyn Smith, was released on January 14, 2022. On August 3, 2022, "American Cowgirl", a song written by Casey Brown, Heather Morgan and Monarch music supervisor Adam Anders which is performed by Friel's character Nicky in the show, was released. The series features a mixture of original and cover songs and is released through Arista Records.

Reception

Critical response
The review aggregator website Rotten Tomatoes reported a 33% approval rating with an average rating of 5.8/10, based on 12 critic reviews. The website's critics consensus reads, "Heavy on the clichés while disappointingly light on Susan Sarandon, this Monarch is a so-so successor to a lineage of soaps about families warring over their business empire." Metacritic, which uses a weighted average, assigned a score of 43 out of 100 based on 11 critics, indicating "mixed or average reviews".

Ratings

Notes

References

External links
 
 

2020s American drama television series
2020s American music television series
2022 American television series debuts
2022 American television series endings
American musical television series
Country music television series
English-language television shows
Fox Broadcasting Company original programming
Television series about families
Television series by Fox Entertainment
Television shows set in Texas